Ateizm Derneği (English: Association of Atheism) is a Turkish non-profit organisation founded on 16 April 2014 for the promotion of the concept of atheism, and serves to support irreligious people and freethinkers in Turkey who are discriminated against based on their views. Ateizm Derneği is headquartered in Kadıköy, Istanbul. As of 2019, its president is Selin Özkohen.

History 

At the time of the foundation, the organisation was headed by a board consisting of eleven members, presided by Tolga İnci. It is the first legally recognised Turkish atheist organisation, and simultaneously one of the first in the Muslim-majority world.

The direct cause to form the organisation was a remark made by president Recep Tayyip Erdoğan, who has stimulated tendencies to Islamise Turkey, and said "... despite the [protests of] leftists, despite those atheists. They are terrorists", referring to his enforcement of construction plans, despite student protests in Ankara.

The foundation of the association has bureaucratically run smoothly, but the association has installed surveillance cameras because of harassment and threats, telephone recording devices and a panic button for faster reaching the police.

In 2015, Ateizm Derneği was featured in Dorothée Forma's Dutch documentary film Among Nonbelievers, where several of its members were interviewed by former Dutch Member of Parliament and Dutch Humanist Association president Boris van der Ham.

In 2018, it was reported in some media outlets that the Ateizm Derneği would close down because of the pressure on its members and attacks by pro-government media, but the association itself issued a clarification that this was not the case and that it was still active.

Recognition and awards 
Ateizm Derneği was recognised by the European Union as the representative organisation of Turkish atheists in June 2014.

In 2017, the association won the International League of Non-religious and Atheists's Sapio Award for being the first organisation in the Middle East defending the rights of atheists.

Hate speech and persecution against atheists 
Association members are targeted and received death threats,  access to associations web sites was blocked in Turkey with alleged charges of possible disturbance to law and order . 

In November 2021, during a stereotyping hate speech AKP writer Emine Şenlikoğlu said, “Atheism and deism are like the animal kingdom..." Şenlikoğlu  said, "Father and daughter, mother and son and sibling in atheism or deism indulge in incest." Ateizm Derneği  filed criminal complaint  against the hate speech.

References

External links 
 
 

2014 establishments in Turkey
Atheist organizations
Former Muslims organizations
Non-profit organizations based in Turkey
Organizations based in Istanbul
Secularism in Turkey
Secularist organizations
Skeptic organizations in Turkey